Béquignol is the name of several French wine grape varieties that are grown in Southwest France, Bordeaux and Argentina.

These include:

Béquignol noir
Béquignol blanc and Béquignol gris which are color mutations of Béquignol noir
Fer
Pineau d'Aunis